Statistics for the Kyrgyzstan League for the 1997 season.

Overview
There were 10 teams. Dinamo Bishkek won the championship.

League standings

References
Kyrgyzstan - List of final tables (RSSSF)

Kyrgyzstan League seasons
1
Kyrgyzstan
Kyrgyzstan